For the first time in the history of the Pacific Mini Games, the sport of badminton made its debut at the 2022 Pacific Mini Games in Saipan, Northern Mariana Islands. It was held at the Gilbert C. Ada Gymnasium from the 20-25 June 2022.

Competition schedule

Participating nations
As of 1 June 2022, seven countries and territories have confirmed their participation in badminton's debut for the games.

Medal summary

Medal table

Medalists

Men's singles

Seeds 

 (gold medalist)
 (silver medalist)
 (bronze medalist)
 (second round)

Finals

Top half

Section 1

Section 2

Bottom half

Section 3

Section 4

Women's singles

Seeds 

 (fourth place)
 (bronze medalist)
 (gold medalist)
 (silver medalist)

Finals

Top half

Section 1

Section 2

Bottom half

Section 3

Section 4

Men's doubles

Seeds 

 (fourth place)
 (gold medalist)

Finals

Top half

Bottom half

Women's doubles

Seeds 

 (silver medalist)
 (gold medalist)

Finals

Top half

Bottom half

Mixed doubles

Seeds 

 (gold medalist)
 (silver medalist)
 (second round)
 (second round)

Finals

Top half

Section 1

Section 2

Bottom half

Section 3

Section 4

Mixed team

Standings

Tahiti vs. Northern Mariana Islands

Guam vs. Solomon Islands

New Caledonia vs. Wallis and Futuna

Wallis and Futuna vs. Guam

New Caledonia vs. Northern Mariana Islands

Tahiti vs. Solomon Islands

Northern Mariana Islands vs. Solomon Islands

Tahiti vs. Wallis and Futuna

New Caledonia vs. Guam

New Caledonia vs. Solomon Islands

Northern Mariana Islands vs. Wallis and Futuna

Tahiti vs. Guam

New Caledonia vs. Tahiti

Guam vs. Northern Mariana Islands

Wallis and Futuna vs. Solomon Islands

References

2022
2022 Pacific Mini Games
2022 in badminton